Anthony Christopher Bahadur or Anthony Adur (born February 25, 1988) is a Canadian soccer player who played in the Canadian Soccer League, USL Premier Development League, S. League, Thai Premier League, National Premier Soccer League, and the North American Soccer League.

Career 
Adur began playing in the Ontario Soccer League with Cruz Azul Shooters, where he received the OSL Provincial East U21 MVP award in 2006. As a result, he was called up to play in the Canadian Soccer League with Cruz Azul's parent club the Italia Shooters. In his debut season with Italia he won the CSL  Championship by scoring the lone goal in a 1–0 victory over the Serbian White Eagles. In 2008, he signed with the Toronto Lynx of the USL Premier Development League. He played a total of 11 matches and recorded one goal. After the conclusion of the PDL season he returned to the CSL to sign with North York Astros. He helped the club clinch a postseason berth and faced the White Eagles in the quarterfinals, but lost to a score of 2–1.

On 3 February 2009 signed a contract with Sengkang Punggol FC in Singapore, and  played with former Lynx teammate Murphy Wiredu. In 2010, he signed with Maccabi Haifa in Israel, but was released six months later. He then moved to Thailand to sign with TOT S.C. where he spent two seasons. He had brief stint in National Premier Soccer League in 2012 with Zanesville Athletic FC. In 2013, he returned to Canada to sign with FC Edmonton of the North American Soccer League. In Edmonton he featured in eight matches.

In 2016, he returned to play with his original club the York Region Shooters, where he appeared in 8 matches and recorded 2 goals. During the season, he won the regular season championship. In the preliminary round of the postseason he contributed a goal in 5–0 victory over Milton SC. Their playoff journey came to a conclusion after suffering a 4–1 defeat in a penalty shootout to Hamilton City SC. In 2021, he returned to the Ontario Soccer League to play with GS United.

Honours

Italia/York Region Shooters  
 CSL Championship: 2006
 Canadian Soccer League Regular Season Champions: 2016
2006: MVP of the Year in the OSL Provincial East U21

References

External links
 Anthony Adur Interview
 Adur dreams of MLS, national team; hopes that FC Edmonton can relaunch his career

1988 births
Living people
Canadian soccer players
North York Astros players
Toronto Lynx players
Canadian Soccer League (1998–present) players
Expatriate footballers in Singapore
USL League Two players
Hougang United FC players
Anthony Adur
FC Edmonton players
Singapore Premier League players
Soccer players from Toronto
Anthony Adur
National Premier Soccer League players
North American Soccer League players
York Region Shooters players
Association football forwards
Canadian expatriate sportspeople in Singapore
Canadian expatriate sportspeople in the United States
Canadian expatriate sportspeople in Thailand
Maccabi Haifa F.C. players
Canadian expatriate sportspeople in Israel
Expatriate footballers in Thailand
Expatriate soccer players in the United States
Expatriate footballers in Israel
Canadian expatriate soccer players
Black Canadian soccer players